Béla Bay (8 February 1907 – 26 July 1999) was a Hungarian épée and foil fencer. He competed at the 1936 and 1948 Summer Olympics.

References

External links
 

1907 births
1999 deaths
Hungarian male épée fencers
Olympic fencers of Hungary
Fencers at the 1936 Summer Olympics
Fencers at the 1948 Summer Olympics
People from Seini
Hungarian male foil fencers